Hashmat Karzai was an Afghan-American businessman and political advisor.

Biography
Hashmat Khalil Karzai was born in Afghanistan. He was a cousin of Afghan President Hamid Karzai. Karzai ran security and construction companies in Afghanistan. He was a powerbroker in the Kandahar Province and was seen as a tribal leader of the Popalzai, a Pashtun tribe. He was a supporter of presidential candidate Ashraf Ghani. Some sources go as far as to call him his "campaign manager." Additionally, he held an American passport.

Personal life
Karzai had a pet lion and smoked cigars. He was called by many in Kandahar as the "Lion of Kandahar".

Death
Hashmat Karzai was killed by a suicide bomber at his private residence in Karz near Kandahar on July 29, 2014.

References

Afghan businesspeople
Hashmat
Year of birth missing
2014 deaths
Afghan murder victims
People murdered in Afghanistan
People from Kandahar Province
20th-century Afghan people
21st-century Afghan people
20th-century businesspeople
21st-century businesspeople